Anketrakabe is a town and commune in Madagascar. It belongs to the district of Antsiranana II, which is a part of Diana Region. According to 2001 commune census the population of Anketrakabe was 2,933.

Only primary schooling is available in town. The majority 60% of the population are farmers, while an additional 40% receives their livelihood from raising livestock. The most important crop is maize, while other important products are peanuts and rice.

References and notes 

Populated places in Diana Region